All I Wanna Do may refer to:

Film 
 All I Wanna Do (1998 film) or The Hairy Bird, a Canadian/American teen comedy
 All I Wanna Do (2011 film), a Moroccan documentary

Music 
 "All I Wanna Do" (The Beach Boys song), 1970
 "All I Wanna Do" (Dannii Minogue song), originally released in 1997 and reworked in 2020
 "All I Wanna Do" (Jo Jo Zep & The Falcons song), 1980
 "All I Wanna Do" (Sheryl Crow song), 1994
 "All I Wanna Do" (Martin Jensen song), 2016
 "All I Wanna Do", a song by Dev from I Only See You When I'm Dreamin''' (2017)
 "All I Wanna Do", a song by Davidson from the album Grand Theft Auto 2 soundtrack
 "All I Wanna Do", a song by Full Force
"All I Wanna Do", a song by Jay Park (featuring Hoody and Loco) from the album EVERYTHING YOU WANTED
 "All I Wanna Do", a song by Splashh from the album Comfort "All I Wanna Do Is Make Love to You" or "All I Wanna Do", a 1990 song by Heart from the album Brigade All I Wanna Do (EP), a 2014 EP by T. Mills, or the title song

See also
 "All I Want to Do", a 2008 song by Sugarland from the album Love on the Inside "All I Want to Do" (The Beach Boys song), a 1969 song by the Beach Boys from the album 20/20 "All I Really Want to Do", a song by Bob Dylan from the album Another Side of Bob Dylan'', also covered by the Byrds and by Cher (both 1965)
 All I Really Want to Do (album), a 1965 album by Cher